Matt Stawicki (born in Delaware) is a professional illustrator best known for providing cover art for science fiction and fantasy novels.

Career
His work has also been used for videogame covers, collectible card images, collectors plates and fantasy pocket knives. He claims the work of Maxfield Parrish, N.C. Wyeth, Norman Rockwell as his traditional influences. Working mainly in "digital paint" he is also influenced by the visual worlds created by Walt Disney, George Lucas and Steven Spielberg.

He studied at the Pennsylvania College of Art and Design in Lancaster, Pennsylvania, graduating in 1991. He began his professional career in 1992. He is noted for his work for the Dragonlance series.

Stawicki has illustrated cards for the Magic: The Gathering collectible card game.

His work is included in the book Masters of Dragonlance Art.

Notes

Further reading
 He was featured in Issue 70 of Art Scene International.

External links
 Artist's official site
 
 

American illustrators
Artists from Delaware
Fantasy artists
Living people
Pennsylvania College of Art and Design alumni
Role-playing game artists
Science fiction artists
Year of birth missing (living people)